Tumnob Rolok is a khum (commune) of Stueng Hav District in Sihanoukville Province, Cambodia.

References

Communes of Sihanoukville Province